WGIL 1400 AM is a radio station broadcasting a news-talk-sports format. Licensed to Galesburg, Illinois, the station is owned by Galesburg Broadcasting Company.

WGIL carries a variety of local programming, as well as nationally syndicated shows such as Rush Limbaugh, Clark Howard, and Jim Bohannon.

History
WGIL began broadcasting on June 12, 1938, with its inaugural ceremony at the Galesburg Armory. Among the ceremony's attendees was Edith Luckett Davis, actress and mother of future first lady, Nancy Reagan. Congratulatory telegrams were sent by Bing Crosby, Eddy Duchin, Benny Goodman, Guy Lombardo, and Illinois Governor Henry Horner.

The station originally broadcast at 1500 kHz, running 250 watts during daytime hours only. Nighttime operations were added in 1939. In 1941, the station's frequency was changed to 1400 kHz. Daytime power was increased to 1,000 watts in 1961. Nighttime power was increased to 1,000 watts in 1985. In 1997, the station's power was reduced to 740 watts.

In the 1970s, 1980s, and 1990s, the station aired a MOR format. By 1987, the station had begun airing talk programming. By 1999, the station had adopted a news-talk-sports format.

Translator
In 2015, WGIL began to be rebroadcast on 93.7 FM, through a translator in Galesburg.

References

External links
WGIL's website

GIL
News and talk radio stations in the United States
Galesburg, Illinois
Radio stations established in 1938
1938 establishments in Illinois